Old Friends or Old Friend may refer to:

Music

Albums
 Old Friends (Willie Nelson album), a 1982 album by Willie Nelson
Old Friends (Guy Clark album), a 1988 album by Guy Clark
Old Friends (André Previn album), 1992
Old Friends (1997 Simon and Garfunkel album), a 1997 box set by Simon and Garfunkel
Old Friends: Live on Stage, a 2004 concert album by Simon and Garfunkel
Old Friends (The Expos album), 2007
Old Friends (Outlaw album), a 2012 album by Outlaw (Terry Pugh)

Songs
 "Old Friends" (Simon & Garfunkel song), 1968
 "Old Friends" (Pinegrove song), 2016
 "Old Friend", a song by Hopsin from the 2013 album Knock Madness
 "Old Friend", a song by Elton John & Nik Kershaw from the 1993 album Duets
 "Old Friends", a song by Everything but the Girl from the 1991 album Worldwide
 "Old Friends", a song by Dogwood from the 1998 album Dogwood
 "Old Friends", a song by The Bear Quartet from the 2000 album My War
 "Old Friends", a song by Stuart A. Staples from the 2006 album Leaving Songs
 "Old Friends", a song by Ben Rector from the 2018 album Magic

Film and television
"Old Friends", a season 4 episode of the animated TV series Alvin and the Chipmunks
"Old Friends" (Burn Notice), a 2007 episode of Burn Notice
"Old Friends" (Golden Girls episode), a 1987 episode of The Golden Girls

Books and comics
Old Friends (Angel comic), a series of comic books based on the Angel television series
Old Friends (Bernice anthology), a 2006 collection of novellas featuring the Dr. Who character Bernice Summerfield

Places
Old Friends Archeological Site, a Quaker historical site in Rhode Island
Old Friends Equine, a horse farm in Kentucky